The First Straujuma cabinet was the government of Latvia from 22 January to 5 November 2014. It was the first government to be led by Laimdota Straujuma, who was Prime Minister between 2014 and 2016. It took office on 22 January 2014, after the resignation of Valdis Dombrovskis and was abolished on November 5 the same year at the formation of the Second Straujuma cabinet.

Government of Latvia
2014 establishments in Latvia
2014 disestablishments in Latvia
Cabinets established in 2014
Cabinets disestablished in 2014